Angene Oru Avadhikkalathu is a 1999 Indian Malayalam-language drama film directed by Mohan and written by Sreenivasan from a story by Nedumudi Venu. It stars Sreenivasan, Samyuktha Varma, and Mukesh. The music was composed by Johnson. Angene Oru Avadhikkalathu won two Kerala State Film Awards: Best Music Director and Best Female Singer.

Plot
Balakrishnan ("Bala") teaches history at a primary school in a hillside community. In the same school, Nirmala was recently hired for a temporary position as a music teacher. Despite falling in love with Nirmala, Balakrishnan is too shy to admit his feelings. Bala decides to go with Nirmala to her ancestral village in an effort to grow closer to her. On the way, Bala runs across his old friend Babu, whom he hasn't seen in a long time.

Bala and Nirmala are brought to a hotel by Babu. Bala calls an ambulance when Nirmala passes out there. Nirmala requests Bala to drop her off at the bus stop once she has recovered. Bala agrees after observing her distress. When Teena arrives, she claims that her father's close friend, Papachan, has been pressuring her to sleep with one of his wealthy friends. She approaches Bala, terrified, for assistance. Teena accepts Bala and Nirmala's invitation to go with them.

Teena gets hurt when the group is attacked by goons on their route. Teena is alleges that she is assaulted by Bala. Even Nirmala accuses Bala to protect herself, which really hurts him. Bala is imprisoned.

Bala encounters Nandakumar (referred to as "Nanda") on the bus after leaving prison and tells him everything that happened. The two get along quite well, and Nanda gets Bala a great job. Bala is unaware that Nanda is about to marry Nirmala.

After a series of incidents, Nirmala and Bala finally cross paths. Nirmala is questioned by Bala about why she made the false claim about being attacked. According to Nirmala, Papachan persuaded her into doing so. The confusion has been resolved. When Nanda finds out about Nirmala and Bala's relationship, he asks Nirmala if she still has feelings for him. Nirmala, overcome with emotion, says yes. Nanda walks off from the pair, giving them time to make up.

Cast
 Sreenivasan as Balakrishnan
 Samyuktha Varma as Nirmala
 Mukesh as Nandakumar
 Sai Kumar as Babu
 Innocent as Kaimal
 Nedumudi Venu as Delhi Pappachan
 Cochin Hanifa as Jose Panachikadan
 K. P. A. C. Lalitha as Kunji
 Unnikrishnan Namboothiri as Parameswara Warrier
 Ottapalam Pappan as peon
 Valsala Menon as Balakrishnan's grandmother
Paravoor Ramachandran

Soundtrack

Awards 
Kerala State Film Awards
 Best Female Singer: K. S. Chithra ("Pular Veyilum")
 Kerala State Film Award for Best Music Director: Johnson

References

External links
 

1999 films
1990s Malayalam-language films
Mohan